Edna May Ryan (born 8 December 1946) is a New Zealand former cricketer who played as a wicket-keeper and right-handed batter. She appeared in 5 Test matches and 15 One Day Internationals for New Zealand between 1975 and 1982. She played domestic cricket for Auckland.

References

External links
 
 

1946 births
Living people
Cricketers from Auckland
New Zealand women cricketers
New Zealand women Test cricketers
New Zealand women One Day International cricketers
Auckland Hearts cricketers